The Bridgerian North American Stage on the geologic timescale is the North American  faunal stage according to the North American Land Mammal Ages chronology (NALMA), typically set from 50,300,000 to 46,200,000 years BP lasting . 

It is usually considered to overlap the Ypresian and Lutetian within the Eocene epoch. 

The Bridgerian is preceded by the Wasatchian and followed by the Uintan NALMA stages.

Substages
The Bridgerian is considered to contain the following substages:
Twinbuttean: Lower boundary source of the base of the Bridgerian (approximate).
Lutetian which is contained within the Middle Eocene sharing the lower boundary. The Lutetian overlaps with New Zealand's Arnold epoch, Dannevirke epoch, Bortonian stage, and Heretaungan stage.

References

 
Eocene life
Eocene animals of North America